Joseph Tomlinson (June 22, 1816 – May 10, 1905) was an English American engineer and architect who built bridges and lighthouses in Canada and the United States. In 1868, he co-designed and oversaw the construction of the Hannibal Bridge, the first permanent crossing of the Missouri River. He was the first person to hold the position of General Superintendent of Lighthouses for the new Dominion of Canada, holding that position beginning in January 1870. For eight years, he worked building railroad bridges for the Canadian government, and designed one of the most impressive bridges on the Canadian Pacific Railway where it crossed the Fraser River. He designed a railroad bridge over the Ashtabula River in Ohio, but was fired from the project after he refused to make supervisor-ordered changes to the design which he considered unsafe. The bridge failed on December 29, 1876, killing 92 people in a train derailment.

Early life and education
Tomlinson was born June 22, 1816, in Ruskington, Lincolnshire, in the United Kingdom to Joseph and Ann Tomlinson. His father was a land owner and farmer, and the family was related to Canadian politician Nicholas Sparks. Joseph was one of 14 children.

Tomlinson showed a strong interest in mechanical design as a child, but his parents sought to give him a classical education. When he proved disinterested in the classics, he was allowed to apprentice to a cabinetmaker. Tomlinson spent seven years as an apprentice, and soon his work surpassed even that of his teachers. During this time, he also enrolled at the Mechanics' Institute in Newark, Nottinghamshire. He studied draughtsmanship and mathematics and was considered an outstanding student.

Career
Tomlinson emigrated to the United States in 1840. During the ocean voyage, he met a man from New Milford, Connecticut, who persuaded him to settle in that town. Although trained as a mechanic, Tomlinson discovered the practice mechanical construction in the United States was much different than that in the United Kingdom, and he found himself unemployed.

Early bridge work
Shortly after his arrival in New Milford, Tomlinson observed a bridge being constructed near the town. Concerned that the bridge had not been properly designed, he informed the builder only to have his opinion disregarded. Tomlinson then informed his new friend, Rev. Noah Porter (later President of Yale University), about his misgivings. The bridge partially collapsed under its own weight as Tomlinson had predicted, and he was employed to help repair and strengthen it.

Tomlinson turned to the practice of engineering on the advice of Rev. Porter. To learn his new trade, he found work as a rodman with the Housatonic Railroad. He also worked for several bridge construction firms, learning the trade and principles of American bridge design. In his spare time, he drafted and designed bridges for himself, seeking criticism and advice from Housatonic Railroad bridge engineers he worked under. In time, the Housatonic asked him to study bridges designed by other engineers and make reports about them. He was eventually employed as a bridge construction worker and supervisor for the Housatonic Railroad, the Harlem Railroad in New York, and the Rutland and Whitehall Railroad in Vermont. Although most railroad bridges at the time were made of wood, Tomlinson foresaw that iron and steel would swiftly supplant wood as the primary construction material. A lifelong self-learner who studied and read widely, he learned the principles of iron and steel construction and engineering.

The first bridge to be built to a Tomlinson design was a railroad bridge in Pittsfield, Connecticut. It was constructed in 1844, and Tomlinson himself acted as the general contractor.

In 1849, the Saratoga and Washington Railroad resolved to build a tunnel through a hill in the village of Whitehall, New York. The tunnel was to carry a branch line of the railroad, which would terminate on the shores of Lake Champlain. This would give the railroad a connection with Great Lakes passenger steamships, and connect the lake by rail to the Hudson River. Several previous attempts to dig a tunnel had failed due to the presence of quicksand. When Tomlinson received the commission to design the dig and completed tunnel, he worked on his plans for 72 hours without a break or sleep.

New Brunswick work

Tomlinson took a job as a bridge engineer with the government of the British colony (now Canadian province) of New Brunswick in 1854. Tomlinson later estimated he built 13 or 14 bridges a year during his eight years in New Brunswick. Nearly all the bridges he built in New Brunswick were made of wood. His designs were so sturdy that most of the bridges were still standing a half century later.

The first Tomlinson-designed bridge to collapse was a lenticular truss bridge over the Grand Falls of the Saint John River at the recently founded city of Grand Falls. The New Brunswick Board of Works argued against a suspension bridge, and forced Tomlinson to design a lenticular bridge. The bridge opened on December 1, 1858. At 7 AM on December 18, the bridge collapsed after the tension-bar chain snapped in two places. Two men were killed. The cause of the collapse was defective iron, which became brittle in cold weather. The Board of Works assumed complete responsibility for the failure of the bridge, and Tomlinson declined to charge the government for his work. He designed a  suspension bridge as a replacement; that bridge remained standing for decades, and became the best-known of his bridges.

Ohio and Missouri
After purchasing a farm on the Cedar River in Putnam Township near Cedar Rapids, Iowa, Tomlinson moved there in 1862 and briefly took up farming. He moved to Cleveland, Ohio, later that year and began designing bridges for the Lake Shore and Michigan Southern Railway (LS&MS). He designed and built between 12 and 15 bridges a year for the railroad. Tomlinson moved into architecture as well, designing a number of buildings in Cleveland. Among the most important of Tomlinson's commissions was the Central Market, an indoor market space located at Ontario Street and Eagle Avenue. Built in 1867 at a cost of $20,000 ($ in  dollars), the facility contained space for 200 vendors. Tomlinson also won the contract to build all the marble-topped meat and vegetable stalls inside the market. Tomlinson also designed the Central Way drawbridge over the Cuyahoga River, which was built in 1866.

His efforts on behalf of the LS&MS garnered him widespread notice in the railroad industry, and he signed several contracts to build railroad bridges in Indiana. He sold these contracts to others when the railroads failed to fund construction. From 1848 to 1849, he worked for Schuyler Bros., designing and overseeing some of the early construction on the Illinois Central Railroad during this time as well. He left this work after the railroad encountered financial difficulties.

Tomlinson got word in 1867 that civil engineer Octave Chanute was attempting to build a railroad bridge (the Hannibal Bridge) across the Missouri River at Kansas City, Missouri. He communicated with Chanute, expressing his interest in working on the bridge. Chanute hired him as one of the bridge's co-designers in October 1867. Tomlinson relocated to Kansas City from Cleveland to work on the bridge. Tomlinson designed the bridge's superstructure, and supervised the overall construction of the bridge. When the piers in the river were washed out, Chanute asked Tomlinson to rebuild them. Tomlinson created entirely new designs for the piers and their foundations, and then oversaw their construction. The bridge opened on July 4, 1869, with a ceremony in which Chanute presented Tomlinson with a gold watch. The bridge was the first permanent crossing of the Missouri River.

Ashtabula River railroad disaster

In 1863, officials of the Cleveland, Painesville and Ashtabula Railroad (CP&A; one of the predecessors of the Lake Shore and Michigan Southern Railway), decided to replace the wooden bridge over the Ashtabula River just east of the village of Ashtabula, Ohio with an iron structure. Amasa Stone was president of the CP&A. His construction firm had built the CP&A main line from 1850 to 1852, and Stone had purchased the patent rights to brother-in-law William Howe truss bridge in 1842. Stone resolved to construct a Howe truss bridge, a commonly used type of railroad bridge, and personally designed the new bridge. Stone also decided to award the contract for the ironwork to the Cleveland Rolling Mills, an iron and steel company based in Cleveland, Ohio, run by his older brother, Andros Stone.

Amasa Stone's bridge was, by his own admission, experimental. Tomlinson fleshed out the bridge design for Stone. He was alarmed when Stone demanded that the bridge be constructed completely of iron, rather than a combination of wood and iron. An all-iron bridge would have a much greater deadweight, reducing the bridge's live load (its ability to carry trains). He also concluded that the beams Stone intended to use were undersized. Stone demanded that Tomlinson make the changes he required. Tomlinson refused, and was fired. Stone then ordered the CP&A's chief engineer, Charles Collins, to make the desired changes to the bridge design. Collins refused, and was fired. Stone himself then made the changes to the design.

The Ashtabula River bridge was erected in 1865 using Stone's design and partly under his supervision. When the temporary wooden trestle supporting the new bridge was removed, the bridge buckled where the chords were connected to the deck. To correct this problem, Stone added more iron I-beams to brace the chords. This worsened the bridge's deadweight problem. Because the angle blocks were not designed to accommodate the braces, Stone ordered workers to cut away portions of the I-beams to make them fit. This further weakened the braces. During the repair work, workers inadvertently installed the I-beam braces sideways rather than vertically, weakening the ability of the braces to reinforce the bridge. There is evidence that some I-beams were then installed correctly, but that the angle blocks were damaged in the process. Furthermore, in every other joint, the diagonal chords were fitted to the angle blocks using shims rather than tightening the vertical beams and putting the diagonals under compression. Rather than rely on the truss design to carry live loads, the shims carried this weight by themselves. At the ends of the bridge, where Stone used only a single diagonal, only half of the angle block received load. This put enormous shear stress on the angle block.

At 7:30 PM on December 29, 1876, the Ashtabula River bridge collapsed in what came to be known as the Ashtabula River railroad disaster. Two locomotives hauling 11 passenger railcars of the Lake Shore and Michigan Southern Railway plunged  into the ice-clogged river below. The wooden cars burst into flame when their kerosene-fed heating stoves and oil lamps overturned, and rescue personnel made no attempt to extinguish the fire. The accident killed 92 people and injured 64.

An investigation was immediately begun into the cause of the bridge's collapse. This took two months. The proximate cause of the bridge collapse was the failure of the two angle blocks on the west end of the bridge due to fatigue (caused by bending and shear stress), friction, thrust stress from improperly fitting chords and vertical beams, and low temperatures (which caused the cast iron to become brittle). This caused the horizontal deck beams to buckle, and the bridge to collapse. State investigators later concluded that the bridge had been improperly designed. However, faulty materials were also use in its construction. There was also extensive evidence that the bridge had been poorly constructed: Vertical beams were not in the correct place, chords were not tied together, the bearings had been improperly laid, and horizontal beams did not meet the angle blocks straight. The railway had also inadequately inspected and maintained the bridge. Stone categorically denied that there were any design or construction flaws, and blamed the collapse on the derailment of one of the two locomotives pulling the train.

Return to Canada
Culminating an almost 17 year effort, the British North America Act confederated the British colonies of Canada, New Brunswick, and Nova Scotia into a new self-governing, autonomous dominion, Canada, on July 1, 1867. Departments of the Province of Canada became ministries in the new federal government. Since the Province of Canada had no fisheries or marine departments, the new dominion government absorbed and amalgamated those from New Brunswick and Nova Scotia. Peter Mitchell, the former Premier of the Colony of New Brunswick, was named to the inaugural Senate of Canada and appointed Minister of Marine and Fisheries.

Mitchell was well-acquainted with Tomlinson's work in New Brunswick, and asked him to join the new Department of Marine and Fisheries. Tomlinson agreed, and began working for the department on January 1, 1870. He was formally appointed General Superintendent of Lighthouses and Constructive Engineer on May 5, 1871. His duties in regards to new lighthouses were to select sites, visit sites prior to construction, prepare plans and specifications, visit sites during construction, and examine and report on the lighthouses once finished. He was also to inspect existing lighthouses, report on their condition, and recommend needed repairs. Tomlinson initially faced the difficult job of integrating the policies and practices of more than a dozen local, provincial, and regional lighthouse boards into a common code. He then had to develop designs for lighthouses. This project was especially difficult, as almost no plans for existing lighthouses existed to help inform best practices in lighthouse construction. By 1872, the department had erected 93 lighthouses with another 43 under contract. All of the structures were wooden, and each cost less than CAD$10,000. The number of lighthouses expanded so rapidly in the first five years of Tomlinson's work that in 1876 the Department of Marine and Fisheries established six regional agencies to take over responsibility for their operation and upkeep. Among the hundreds of lighthouses designed by Tomlinson, the East End Light and West End Light on Sable Island and Greenly Island are examples of his best work.

Tomlinson transferred to the Department of Railways on February 9, 1880, taking a position as inspector of bridges in railways. During his time with the department, he created standardized designs for wooden bridges and trestles for those portions of the Canadian Pacific Railway being built by the federal government. In 1882, the department sent Tomlinson to Newcastle upon Tyne in England to supervise the manufacture and prefabrication of the metalwork Cisco Bridge. Tomlinson also served as a construction superintendent for general contractor John McMullen. Completed in 1884, this bridge has been called "one of the most imposing engineering works on the Canadian Pacific Railway's transcontinental main line" by rail historian Michael Batten.

Tomlinson left the employ of the Department of Railways on either October 16, 1886 or February 9, 1888.

Retirement and death

Tomlinson retired to a home at 217 North 13th Street in Cedar Rapids, Iowa, leaving the Department of Railways. After the American Civil War, he purchased another  of farmland for $800 ($ in  dollars). His eldest son managed the farm for him.

In the last years of his life, Tomlinson suffered from declining health, which included cerebrovascular disease. He retained his mental faculties, however. In the months just before his death, Tomlinson began working out the design for an extremely long suspension bridge. He received three patents for his design. Joseph Tomlinson died of a stroke on May 10, 1905, while gardening at his home. He was buried in Woodland Cemetery in Cleveland, Ohio.

Personal life
Tomlinson was quite strong, and when younger often engaged in manual labor and construction work. He was an easy-going and kind supervisor, and much admired by his work crews. When others were still erecting bridges primarily from experience and rules of thumb, Tomlinson calculated load limits and strain using advanced mathematics.

Tomlinson was a skilled carpenter, and built furniture for his own home throughout his life. From his farming father, Tomlinson learned a love of farming and gardening. Until the end of his life, he remained an avid home gardener, and had a deep fondness for flowers. Influenced by the Chartist movement, Tomlinson became a socialist in adolescence and continued to advocate for socialist political goals throughout his life. Tomlinson was also a Freemason, a supporter of the Republican Party, and a lifelong member of the Episcopal Church. He was a member of Grace Episcopal Church in Cedar Rapids at the time of his death.

Wives and children
Joseph Tomlinson married Ann R. Northrop of New Milford on December 10, 1843. The couple had three daughters: Ida (wife of George Venable Smith), Ione, and Maria (who died in childhood). The Tomlinsons moved to Iowa City, Iowa, in 1852, where Ann Tomlinson fell ill and died on January 15, 1853. He moved to Brooklyn, New York, shortly after his first wife's death. He married Sarah A. Wyles (also an emigrant from Lincolnshire) on September 10, 1853. The couple had five children: Ann (wife of Robert Nicholas Slater), Joseph, Alfred, Fannie (who died at the age of five), and Frances.

Legacy
The Engineering Record called Tomlinson "a pioneer designer and builder of steel bridges in this country." The Cedar Rapids Gazette called him one of the most preeminent bridge designers of the last half of the 19th century.

Tomlinson was inducted as an honorary member of The Pi Eta Scientific Society.

References
Notes

Citations

Bibliography

1816 births
1905 deaths
People from Ruskington
British emigrants to the United States
19th-century American architects
American bridge engineers